These are the official results of the Men's 20 km Walk event at the 1993 World Championships in Stuttgart, Germany. There were a total of 48 participating athletes, with the final held on Sunday August 15, 1993.

Medalists

Abbreviations
All times shown are in hours:minutes:seconds

Records

Intermediates

Final ranking

See also
 1990 Men's European Championships 20km Walk (Split)
 1992 Men's Olympic 20km Walk (Barcelona)
 1993 Race Walking Year Ranking
 1994 Men's European Championships 20km Walk (Helsinki)
 1995 Men's World Championships 20km Walk (Gothenburg)

References
 Results
 Die Leichtathletik-Statistik-Seite

W
Racewalking at the World Athletics Championships